Mischarytera is a genus of rainforest trees, constituting part of the plant family Sapindaceae. Four species are known to science , found growing naturally in eastern Queensland, Australia, and in New Guinea. Formerly until 1995, they had names within the genus Arytera, subgenus Mischarytera.

In 2006 botanist Paul I. Forster formally scientifically described Mischarytera megaphylla  based on specimens collected from trees of a restricted area (endemic) of the lowland Daintree Rainforest region, part of the larger Wet Tropics region of north-eastern Queensland, Australia. Before the formal description these trees were known and informally described as Mischarytera sp. Oliver Creek ( L.J.Webb+ 10903) Qld Herbarium and Sapindaceae sp. (Noah Creek BG 6026).

Species
 Mischarytera bullata  – New Guinea endemic
 – synonym: base name: Arytera bullata 
 Mischarytera lautereriana ; Corduroy Tamarind – NE. to SE. Qld endemic
 – synonyms: base name: Nephelium lautererianum ; nomenclatural: Arytera lautereriana 
 Mischarytera macrobotrys  – Cape York Peninsula, Qld and New Guinea
 – synonyms: base name: Mischocarpus macrobotrys ; nomenclatural: Arytera macrobotrys 
 Mischarytera megaphylla  – NE. Qld endemic
 – synonyms: Mischarytera sp. Oliver Creek ( L.J.Webb + 10903) Qld Herbarium; Sapindaceae sp. (Noah Creek BG 6026)

References

Cited works 

 
 

Flora of New Guinea
Flora of Papua New Guinea
Flora of Queensland
Sapindales of Australia
Sapindaceae genera
Sapindaceae